Drift is a 2015 Swiss drama film directed by Karim Patwa.

Cast
 Sabine Timoteo as Alice Keller 
 Max Hubacher as Robert Felder

References

External links
 

2015 films
2015 drama films
Swiss drama films
Swiss German-language films
2010s German-language films